Caputoraptor is an extinct genus of insect from the Cenomanian aged Burmese amber containing two species: the type species Caputoraptor elegans, as well as Caputoraptor vidit. It is part of the extinct order Alienoptera. C. elegans is notable for the presence of a scissor like mechanism consisting of a straight edge on the back of the head and corresponding serrated edges on the first thoracic segment, these were initially suggested to be used by the female to grasp the male during mating, but the structure is not sexually dimorphic, so a use to hold prey was subsequently suggested. Its morphology suggests a predatory habit inhabiting shrubs and trees. In 2020 a Caputoraptor elegans nymph was described that was in the process of being predated upon by a Ceratomyrmex hell ant.

References

Prehistoric insect genera
Burmese amber
Fossil taxa described in 2018
Dictyoptera